Ramon Cedric "Ray" Thomas (born 18 November 1932) is a former cricketer and baseballer who represented South Australia in both sports in the 1950s.

Ray Thomas attended Adelaide High School. A right-arm fast-medium bowler, he played most of the 1952–53 season for South Australia, but despite claiming the South African captain Jack Cheetham as his first wicket he was unable to make the most of his opportunities and did not play again after that season. At baseball, he represented South Australia as a pitcher.

References

External links
 
Ramon Thomas at CricketArchive

1932 births
Living people
Australian cricketers
South Australia cricketers
Cricketers from Adelaide
People educated at Adelaide High School